Hébertville station is a Via Rail station in Hébertville-Station, Quebec, Canada. It is located on Rue St-Louis, 10 km south of Alma.

External links

Via Rail stations in Quebec
Railway stations in Saguenay–Lac-Saint-Jean